Wayne Riley (born 17 September 1962) is an Australian professional golfer.

Career
Riley was born in Sydney. He turned professional in 1977, and started out on the PGA Tour of Australasia. He has won several tournaments in Australia and New Zealand, including the 1991 Australian Open.

Riley came through the European Tour's final qualifying school in 1984, but had to wait eleven years before winning his first tournament on the tour, the 1995 Scottish Open. He played on the European Tour for almost twenty years, and won only one other tour event, the 1996 Portuguese Open. He finished a career high 11th on the Order of Merit in 1995.

Riley represented Australia in the 1996 Alfred Dunhill Cup and the 1997 World Cup.

Since leaving the tour, Riley has worked for Sky Sports as an on course commentator on their European Tour coverage.

Radar has four children who all reside in England.

Professional wins (6)

European Tour wins (2)

PGA Tour of Australasia wins (4)

PGA Tour of Australasia playoff record (1–0)

Results in major championships

Note: Riley never played in the Masters Tournament or the PGA Championship.

CUT = missed the half-way cut (3rd round cut in 1984 Open Championship)
"T" = tied

Team appearances
Dunhill Cup (representing Australia): 1996
World Cup (representing Australia): 1997

Notes

References

External links

Australian male golfers
PGA Tour of Australasia golfers
European Tour golfers
1962 births
Living people